Hemilienardia goubini is a species of sea snail, a marine gastropod mollusk in the family Raphitomidae.

Description
The length of the shell varies between 3.5 mm and 5 mm.

This is a very small species, light violet with a white transverse band around the body whorl. The shell contains 7-8 whorls, with two smooth, acuminate ones in the protoconch. The whorls are rotund and longitudinally crassicostate. The numerous lirae are tenuous. The violet aperture is irregularly sinuate. The outer lip is incrassate and shows four teeth on the inside region. The sinus is below the suture. The sinus is wide open and moderately deep.

Distribution
This marine species occurs off the Philippines, Loyalty Islands, Papua New Guinea and Queensland, Australia.

References

 Melvill, J.C. & Standen, R. 1897. Notes on a collection of shells from Lifu and Uvea, Loyalty Islands, formed by the Rev. James and Mrs Hadfield, with list of species. Part 3. Journal of Conchology 8: 396–421 
 Powell, A.W.B. 1966. The molluscan families Speightiidae and Turridae, an evaluation of the valid taxa, both Recent and fossil, with list of characteristic species. Bulletin of the Auckland Institute and Museum. Auckland, New Zealand 5: 1–184, pls 1–23 
 Wiedrick S.G. (2017). Aberrant geomorphological affinities in four conoidean gastropod genera, Clathurella Carpenter, 1857 (Clathurellidae), Lienardia Jousseaume, 1884 (Clathurellidae), Etrema Hedley, 1918 (Clathurellidae) and Hemilienardia Boettger, 1895 (Raphitomidae), with the description of fourteen new Hemilienardia species from the Indo-Pacific. The Festivus. special issue: 2-45.

External links
  Hedley, C. 1922. A revision of the Australian Turridae. Records of the Australian Museum 13(6): 213-359, pls 42-56 
 Gastropods.com: Hemilienardia goubini
 

goubini
Gastropods described in 1896